D.C. United is an American professional soccer club based in Washington, D.C. that competes in Major League Soccer (MLS), the top tier professional soccer league in the United States of America and Canada. It is one of the ten charter clubs of MLS, having competed in the league since its inception, in 1996. Over the club's history, D.C. United has been considered to be the flagship franchise of MLS winning 13 international and domestic titles. Domestically, United has won the U.S. Open Cup thrice, and holds an MLS record for most MLS Cup and MLS Supporters' Shields apiece, winning each honor four times. United was also the first club to win both the Supporters' Shield and MLS Cup consecutively.

On the international stage, D.C. United has competed in both the CONCACAF Champions League and its predecessor the CONCACAF Champions' Cup. The club is also the only American soccer club to ever compete in a CONMEBOL competition, participating in the 2005 and 2007 editions of the Copa Sudamericana. In 1998, the club won the CONCACAF Champions' Cup. Subsequently, United won the now-defunct Copa Interamericana, a competition between the CONCACAF on CONMEBOL champion that year to determine the best soccer club in the Americas. In the 1998, and final edition of the Copa Interamericana, D.C. United defeated Vasco da Gama of Brazil to take the title.

Key
Key to competitions

 Major League Soccer (MLS) – The top-flight of soccer in the United States, established in 1996.
 U.S. Open Cup (USOC) – The premier knockout cup competition in US soccer, first contested in 1914.
 CONCACAF Champions League (CCL) – The premier competition in North American soccer since 1962. It went by the name of Champions' Cup until 2008.

Key to colors and symbols

Key to league record
 Season = The year and article of the season
 Div = Division/level on pyramid
 League = League name
 Pld = Games played
 W = Games won
 L = Games lost
 D = Games drawn
 GF = Goals for
 GA = Goals against
 GD = Goal difference
 Pts = Points
 PPG = Points per game
 Conf. = Conference position
 Overall = League position

Key to cup record
 DNE = Did not enter
 DNQ = Did not qualify
 NH = Competition not held or canceled
 QR = Qualifying round
 PR = Preliminary round
 GS = Group stage
 R1 = First round
 R2 = Second round
 R3 = Third round
 R4 = Fourth round
 R5 = Fifth round
 Ro16 = Round of 16
 QF = Quarter-finals
 SF = Semi-finals
 F = Final
 RU = Runners-up
 W = Winners

Seasons

1. Avg. attendance include statistics from league matches only.
2. Top goalscorer(s) includes all goals scored in League, MLS Cup Playoffs, U.S. Open Cup, MLS is Back Tournament, CONCACAF Champions League, FIFA Club World Cup, and other competitive continental matches.

References 

General
MLS statistics sourced to: 
U.S. Open Cup statistics sourced to: 
CONCACAF statistics sourced to: 
Top scorers sourced to: 

Seasons
 
Dc United
D.C. United seasons